The 2008 Subway Fresh Fit 500 was the eighth race for the NASCAR Sprint Cup season and ran on Saturday, April 12 at Phoenix International Raceway for 312 laps in Avondale, Arizona. The race was broadcast on television by Fox starting at 8:53 PM US EDT, and broadcast via radio and Sirius Satellite Radio on the Motor Racing Network beginning at 7:45 PM US EDT.

Pre-Race News
Jeremy Mayfield was dropped as the driver of the Haas CNC Racing #70 Chevrolet and replaced by the former driver of the #70 car they own, Johnny Sauter.

Qualifying
Daytona 500 champion Ryan Newman won the pole position, the 34th of his career.  Elliott Sadler started on the outside.  Kyle Petty and John Andretti failed to qualify.

Full qualifying results 

OP: qualified via owners points

PC: qualified as past champion

PR: provisional

QR: via qualifying race

* - had to qualify on time

The race
The outcome of this race was determined largely on fuel mileage strategy.  Based on crew chief Chad Knaus' calculations, Jimmie Johnson stayed out late in the race while leaders Dale Earnhardt Jr. and Mark Martin entered their pits.  Johnson held on for the win while Clint Bowyer finished second.

Jeff Burton climbed from 39th starting position to a sixth-place finish and retained his lead in points.

Results

Yankees / Red Sox coverage
Coverage of the pre-race was interrupted when Fox switched over to cover the remaining New York Yankees-Boston Red Sox baseball game which had been delayed due to rain. Fox then switched back to the race as the cars were on the dogleg just after the start. The final two pitches of the game were shown on the cable / satellite channel FX leaving some baseball fans confused.  Fox was contractually required to show the entire race on its broadcast network.

NASCAR fans were upset that the network did not show the invocation and national anthem, especially as it was realized that the game was shown on both Fox and FX, in a simulcast, for about 10 minutes.  Theoretically, the baseball game could have continued on Fox and the pre-race ceremonies would have been seen on FX, but parent company News Corporation chose not to use that option.

This is the first known occurrence in the history in American sports television that a network missed both the ending of one event (similar to the Heidi Game, except that there was an option to see the remainder of it) and the beginning of another.

On the Speed Channel rebroadcast later that week, the start of the race was shown, in real time, from Brett Bodine pulling the pace car to pit road, and Fox analyst Larry McReynolds waving the green flag, all the way through the entire first lap.  It is evident in that replay that the broadcast started on the backstretch as the graphics package did not appear until the cars were on the dogleg.

References

External links
Complete race results
Points standings
Complete weather information

Subway Fresh Fit 500
Subway Fresh Fit 500
NASCAR races at Phoenix Raceway